The 2012–13 football season in Belgium, which is the 110th season of competitive football in the country and runs from July 2012 until June 2013.

National team football

Men's national football team

With no less than four players winning individual awards as best player in their league following conclusion of the 2011–12 season, namely Eden Hazard (in France), Vincent Kompany (in England), Kevin Mirallas (in Greece) and Jan Vertonghen (in the Netherlands), questions were raised how it was possible that Belgium had not managed to qualify for the UEFA Euro 2012 tournament. Moreover, this raised the belief that Belgium would qualify for the 2014 FIFA World Cup, even with rather inexperienced head coach Marc Wilmots in charge after Georges Leekens quit in May 2012.

In a friendly before the actual qualifying campaign, the Red Devils managed to beat the Netherlands by a score of 4-2, with Dries Mertens the man of the match, scoring once and giving two assists. For once, a decent start was made, as Belgium won in Wales and kept Croatia to a 1-1 draw at home. The team continued on their good spirits, following up with a 0-3 win in Serbia, the biggest ever loss for the Serbian team, and a 2-0 win at home against Scotland. This left Belgium and Croatia together in the lead with 10 points out of 12 and with the other four teams trailing 6 or more points behind it already looked like they would be battling it out for first place. Also, by November Belgium moved into position 20 on the FIFA World Rankings, their highest position since 2004. Belgium finished the year 2012 with a 2-1 friendly loss in Romania.

In 2013, Belgium started with a 2-1 win against Slovakia, due to a last minute goal by Dries Mertens, before winning twice against Macedonia to keep their unbeaten status in the FIFA World Cup qualifying campaign. In June, while having risen to a record high 12th position in the FIFA World Rankings, Belgium first beat United States 2-4 in a friendly in Cleveland, before winning their final qualifying match at home against Serbia 2-1. At the same time, Croatia lost at home to Scotland, allowing Belgium to take a three-point lead.

2014 FIFA World Cup qualification

Friendlies

Promotion and relegation
Team promoted to 2012–13 Belgian Pro League
 Belgian Second Division Champions: Charleroi
 Playoff winners: Waasland-Beveren

Teams relegated from 2011–12 Belgian Pro League
 15th Place: Westerlo (lost playoff)
 16th Place: Sint-Truiden

Teams promoted to 2012–13 Belgian Second Division
 Belgian Third Division A Champions: Mouscron-Péruwelz
 Belgian Third Division B Champions: Dessel Sport
 Playoff winners: Oudenaarde

Teams relegated from 2011-12 Belgian Second Division
 16th Place, lost playoff: Tienen
 17th Place: Dender EH
 18th Place: Wetteren

League competitions

Belgian First Division

Belgian Second Division

Belgian Second Division Final Round

Belgian Third Division

Belgian Third Division A

Belgian Third Division B

Third division play-off
All teams marked E entered a promotion playoff.

Only Verbroedering Geel-Meerhout succeeded in being promoted to the 2013–14 Belgian Second Division.

Transfers

European Club results
Champions Anderlecht and runners-up Club Brugge start in the qualifying rounds of the Champions League, while league numbers three and four, Genk and Gent play in the Europa League together with cup winners Lokeren.

Other honours

European qualification for 2013-14 summary

See also
 2012–13 Belgian Pro League
 2012–13 Belgian Cup
 2012 Belgian Super Cup
 Belgian Second Division
 Belgian Third Division: divisions A and B
 Belgian Promotion: divisions A, B, C and D

References